This is the discography of Ron Browz, an American hip hop record producer.

Discography

Studio albums

Compilation albums

EPs

Mixtapes

Miscellaneous

Singles

As lead artist

As featured artist

Guest appearances
2008: "Arab Money" (Busta Rhymes featuring Ron Browz)
2008: "Arab Money (Remix)" (Busta Rhymes featuring Ron Browz, Diddy, Swizz Beatz, T-Pain, Akon & Lil Wayne) 
2008: "Arab Money (Remix Pt. II)" (Busta Rhymes featuring Ron Browz, Rick Ross, Reek Da Villian, Spliff Star, N.O.R.E. & Red Cafe) 
2008: "Arab Money (Remix Pt. III)" (Busta Rhymes featuring Juelz Santana, Jim Jones & Jadakiss)
2008: "Feel Free" (Ricky Blaze featuring Red Cafe & Nicki Minaj)
2008: "Winding on Me" (Fat Joe featuring Ron Browz & Lil Wayne)
2009: "Fill It Up (VIP)" (Brie Beauty featuring Ron Browz, Bow Wow & Hugo) 
2009: "We Want In" (Busta Rhymes featuring Flipmode Squad, Spliff Star & Show Money)
2009: "She's A Killah" (Ghostface Killah featuring Ron Browz)
2009: "Heels On (Remix)" (Slim (of 112) featuring Ron Browz & D aka Deezo)
2009: "Rotate" (C-N-N featuring Busta Rhymes)
2009: "Rotate (Remix)" (C-N-N featuring Swizz Beatz, Busta Rhymes & Jadakiss)
2009: "Rotate (Champion Hoodie Remix)" (C-N-N featuring Maino, Uncle Murda, Joell Ortiz, Charlie Hustle, Spliff Star, Hell Rell, D.O.E., Tru Life, Mike Beck & Max B)
2009: "Champagne Red Lights (Remix)" (O'Neal McKnight featuring Ron Browz & Busta Rhymes)
2009: "Heavy In The Club" (Knocka featuring Ron Browz & Young Truth)
2009: "I Talk Money" (Q Da Kid featuring Ron Browz)
2009: "Skatez On" (Lumidee featuring Boogie Black, Ron Browz & DJ Webstar)
2009: "What They Call Me Big Time" (Bow Wow featuring Nelly & Jermaine Dupri)
2009: "Luv Wit Ya Boy" (Lloyd Banks featuring Ron Browz)
2009: "I Love My Money" (Pryme featuring Ron Browz)  
2010: "Strippin' In The Club" (DJ Diamond Kuts featuring Ron Browz, Latif & Nicki Minaj)
2010: "Say They Ballin'" (Knocka featuring Ron Browz & Nefu Da Don)
2010: "Sak Pase" (Sf (Spark Flame) featuring Ron Browz)
2011: "Say They Ballin' (Remix)" (Knocka featuring Ron Browz, Mann & YG)
2012: "Uptown Boy (Remix)" (P. Swag featuring Ron Browz)
2012: "She's Hot" (Dougie Cash featuring Ron Browz)
2012: "Party Over Here" (Nino Man featuring Ron Browz)
2013: "U Can Do It" (J-Hood featuring Project Pat, Lil' Flip, Torch & Ron Brownz)
2013: "Get At Me" (Papoose featuring Ron Brownz)
2013: "I Got Tha Ca$h" (Al Boogs featuring Ron Brownz)

Music videos

Featured music videos

References

Hip hop discographies
 
 
Discographies of American artists